Leonardo "Léo" Meindl (born March 20, 1993) is a Brazilian professional basketball player for U-BT Cluj-Napoca of the Liga Națională. He formerly played for Paulistano of the Novo Basquete Brasil in Brazil.

Professional career
Meindl began his pro club career in 2011, with the Brazilian League club Franca. He was named the Brazilian League 6th Man of the Year in 2013. Meindl signed with Fuenlabrada in 2020 and averaged 11 points and 5.8 rebounds per game. He re-signed with the team on June 26, 2021.

On August 7, 2022, he signed with U BT Cluj-Napoca of the Liga Națională.

National team career
Meindl represented the senior Brazilian national basketball team at the 2015 FIBA AmeriCup, in Mexico City. He also played at the 2017 FIBA AmeriCup.

References

External links
FIBA Profile
Latinbasket.com Profile
NBB Player Profile 

1993 births
Living people
Associação Bauru Basketball players
Baloncesto Fuenlabrada players
Basketball players at the 2015 Pan American Games
Basketball players from São Paulo
Brazilian expatriate basketball people in Spain
Brazilian men's basketball players
Club Athletico Paulistano basketball players
CS Universitatea Cluj-Napoca (men's basketball) players
Franca Basquetebol Clube players
Liga ACB players
Medalists at the 2015 Pan American Games
Novo Basquete Brasil players
Pan American Games gold medalists for Brazil
Pan American Games medalists in basketball
Small forwards